Final league standings for the 1929-30 St. Louis Soccer League.

League standings

External links
St. Louis Soccer Leagues (RSSSF)
The Year in American Soccer - 1930

1929-30
1929–30 domestic association football leagues
1929–30 in American soccer
St Louis Soccer
St Louis Soccer